The desert hare (Lepus tibetanus) is a species of hare found in Central Asia, Northwest China, and the western Indian subcontinent. Little is known about this species except that it inhabits grassland and scrub areas of desert and semi-desert. The International Union for Conservation of Nature has assessed its conservation status as being of "least concern."

Description
The desert hare is a lightly-built species with a small head. The upper parts are sandy-yellow to drab brown glossed with black, the hip area is greyish and the underparts yellowish-white. The eye is surrounded by an area of pale skin and the ears are broad, lined with tufted hair inside and tipped with black. The forefeet are white as are the outer surfaces of the rear legs. The upper side of the tail has a brownish-black stripe. During the winter, the coat becomes thicker and a sandy-grey colour.

Distribution and habitat
The desert hare is native to Central Asia, its range extending from Afghanistan and northern Pakistan to Mongolia, Xinjiang Uyghur Autonomous Region, Gansu and Inner Mongolia in northern China.

Ecology
The desert hare is herbivorous; its diet includes roots, foliage, stems, berries and seeds. It also will sometimes feed on cacti for moisture. It mainly feeds around dusk but sometimes emerges during the day. Like other hares, it does not dig itself a burrow, but lies concealed in a shallow depression. Females have up to three litters per year, typically of three to ten young each time.

Status
The desert hare has a wide range but the population size and trend is not known. The International Union for Conservation of Nature has assessed its conservation status as being of "least concern" on the grounds that no particular threats are recognised, and if the population is shrinking, it is likely to be doing so at too slow a rate to qualify for a more threatened category.

References

Lepus
Mammals of Pakistan
Mammals of China
Mammals of Mongolia
Mammals of Afghanistan
Mammals described in 1841